Pande, also known as Pande-Gongo after its two dialects, is a Bantu language of the Central African Republic.

References

Ngondi-Ngiri languages